State Road 97 (NM 97) is a state highway in the US state of New Mexico. NM 97's western terminus is NM 161 in Watrous, and the eastern terminus is past the NM 450 intersection where the state maintenance ends.

Major intersections

See also

References

097
Transportation in Mora County, New Mexico